Ilja Sekler (Russian: Илья Секлер, born 1971, Moscow) is a Russian and German violinist.

Life 
Sekler was born into a musical family. His father, Mikhail Sekler, is a virtuoso prizewinning violinist. Ilja Sekler began his violin training in Moscow at the Central Special Music School under tuition of Zinaida Gilels and Alexander Vinnitsky and later studied at the Moscow Conservatory with Valeri Klimov and Sergei Girschenko. He also studied with Werner Scholz at the Hochschule für Musik Hanns Eisler, which he graduated with distinction in 1998, and received important artistic experiences during master classes of Wolfgang Marschner.

Sekler won prizes at the Paganini International Violin Competition in 1989, Carl Nielsen International Violin Competition in 1992, and Wolfgang Marschner competition in 1992 in Weimar, and appeared as a soloist with orchestras in Berlin, Bologna and Cardiff.

He has been an artist of Deutsches Symphonie-Orchester Berlin since 1997.

References
Profile on the Deutsches Symphonie-Orchester Berlin Official website (in German)

1971 births
Living people
Soviet classical violinists
20th-century classical violinists
Male classical violinists
21st-century classical violinists
20th-century male musicians
21st-century male musicians